Paul Naudon (16 April 1915 – 2001), was a Doctor of Law and a 20th-century French historian, author of several books on freemasonry.

Main works 
.
.
 (English translation of above).
.
.

.
.

External links 
 Paul Naudon on data.bnf.fr
 La franc-maçonnerie on PUF
 Les origines religieuses et corporatives de la franc-maçonnerie on Persée

20th-century French historians
French Freemasons
French historiographers
1915 births
2001 deaths